Joseph Harold Gale (born August 26, 1953) is a judge of the United States Tax Court.

He holds a Bachelor of Arts in philosophy from Princeton University and obtained his Juris Doctor from the University of Virginia School of Law in 1980. After five years in private practice, he became an adviser to Senator Daniel Patrick Moynihan, and later held several positions in service to the United States Senate Committee on Finance until 1996.

He was appointed by President Bill Clinton as a judge on the United States Tax Court on February 6, 1996, for a term ending February 5, 2011. He was reappointed by President Barack Obama on July 8, 2011.

Gale is the first openly gay male appointed to the federal bench.

Career 

 Associate Attorney, Dewey Ballantine, Washington, DC, and New York, 1980–83
 Associate Attorney, Dickstein, Shapiro and Morin, Washington, DC, 1983–85
 Tax Legislative Counsel for Senator Daniel Patrick Moynihan, (D-NY), 1985–88
 Administrative Assistant and Tax Legislative Counsel, 1989; Chief Counsel, 1990–93
 Chief Tax Counsel, Committee on Finance, U.S. Senate, 1993–95
 Minority Chief Tax Counsel, Senate Finance Committee, January 1995-July 1995
 Minority Staff Director and Chief Counsel, Senate Finance Committee, July 1995-January 1996;

Organizations 
 District of Columbia Bar
 American Bar Association, Section of Taxation

See also 
 List of LGBT jurists in the United States

References

External links
Official biography 

|-

1953 births
Living people
20th-century American judges
21st-century American judges
American gay men
LGBT people from Virginia
LGBT judges
LGBT lawyers
LGBT appointed officials in the United States
Judges of the United States Tax Court
Princeton University alumni
United States Article I federal judges appointed by Barack Obama
United States Article I federal judges appointed by Bill Clinton
University of Virginia School of Law alumni